Nigerian Library Association (NLA) is the recognized group or organization for librarians working in Nigeria. Its headquarters is in Abuja in the Federal Capital Territory. It was established in 1962 in Ibadan. It was birth from West African Library Association (WALA). Kalu Chioma Okorie (OON), its pioneer president is also one of the first to receive the Fellow Award of the association

Conferences 
The NLA, State Chapters, and Special interest groups hold numerous conferences and themes throughout the year. The largest conference is the annual conference. In 2021, the annual conference was hybrid - physical and virtual. The Academic and Research Libraries (ARLS) of the Nigerian Library Association (NLA) 2021 National Conference/Annual General Meeting (AGM) was scheduled to hold at the University of Nigeria, Nsukka from 26 to 30 September 2021.

Publications 
Nigerian Library Associations publishes newsletters, books, conference proceedings, and Journals. They are:

Newsletters:

 Nigerian Library Association (2020/2021). My vision for NLA. Newsletter. Vol. 29 (1&2), p. 37 January–December 
 Nigerian Library Association (2017). Breaking new grounds. Newsletter. Vol. 26 (1&2), p. 24 January–June 
 Nigerian Library Association (2019). Making inroads & consolidating. Vol. 27 (1&2) January–June 

Books:

 Nigerian Library Association (1970). Constitution as amended by the annual general meeting, 4 April 1970. Ibadan: Nigerian Library Association, 1970, p. 11. 

Conference Proceedings:

 Nigerian Library Association (2017). Libraries in promotion of national integration for development. 55th National Annual Conference of the Nigerian Library Association. Held in University of Lagos, July, 2017, p. 185. . 
 Nigerian Library Association (2012). Nigerian Library Association at 50: Promoting library and information science profession for national development and transformation. Held in Abuja, July 15–19, 2012, p. 306. 
 Nigerian Library Association (1999). Information for the sustenance of a democratic culture: A compendium of paper presentations at the 1999 NLA annual National Conference and AGM, p. 138. 

Journals

 Nigerian Library Association (20121). Nigerian Libraries: Journal of Nigerian Library Association. Vol. 54 (1). January–June. 
 Nigerian Library Association (2019). Nigerian Libraries: Journal of Nigerian Library Association. Vol. 52 (1). January–June. 
 Nigerian Library Association (2016). Nigerian Libraries: Journal of Nigerian Library Association. Vol. 49 (1&2). Jan-Dec. 
 Nigerian Library Association (2011). Nigerian Libraries: Journal of Nigerian Library Association. Vol. 44 (1). July. 
 Nigerian Library Association (2012). Nigerian Libraries: Journal of Nigerian Library Association. Vol. 45 (1). June. 
 Nigerian Library Association (2008). Nigerian Libraries: Journal of Nigerian Library Association. Vol. 41. 
 Nigerian Library Association (2010). Nigerian Libraries: Journal of Nigerian Library Association. Vol. 43 
 Nigerian Library Association (2019). Nigerian Libraries: Journal of Nigerian Library Association. Vol. 49 (1&2). Jan-Dec. 
 Nigerian Library Association (2009). Nigerian Libraries: Journal of Nigerian Library Association. Vol. 42.

Presidents

References

External links 
http://nla.ng/
http://blog.nla.ng/

Libraries in Nigeria
Nigeria